Cornelis Galle the Elder (1576 – 29 March 1650), a younger son of Philip Galle, was born at Antwerp in 1576, and was taught engraving by his father. He followed the example of his brother Theodoor in visiting Rome, where he resided for several years and acquired a correctness of design and a freedom of execution in which he greatly surpassed both his father and his brother. After engraving several plates at Rome, he returned to Antwerp, where he carried on the business of a printseller and engraved many plates after the works of his countrymen and his own designs.  He became a master of the Antwerp Guild of St Luke in 1610. One of his pupils was Giovanni Florimi of Siena.

Prior to his visit to Italy, he engraved some plates in the dry, stiff style of his father, of which the best known are:

A part of the plates of the Life of Christ; after Marten de Vos
A set of plates of the Life of the Virgin Mary; after Stradan
A set of plates of the Life of St. John the Baptist; after the same
The following are the most esteemed of his later prints:

Portraits
St. Charles Borromeo, Cardinal Archbishop of Milan
Philip Rubens, the brother of Peter Paul Rubens
Ferdinand III; after Van Dyck
Jan van Havre; after Rubens
Charles I, King of England; in an allegorical border; after Van der Horst
Henrietta Maria, Queen of Charles I; with a border of flowers and figures; after the same
Leopold William, Archduke of Austria; after W. van de Velde
Artus Wolfart, painter; after Van Dyck
Jan Wiggers; after H. De Smet.
Isabella of Arenberg; after Ch. Wautier
Johannes de Falckenberg; after Van der Horst
Abraham Ortelius; after H. Goltzius

Subjects after various masters

Adam and Eve; after Giov. Batt. Paggi
The Holy Family returning from Egypt, with a Choir of Angels; after the same
Venus caressing Cupid; after the same
St. Peter baptizing St. Priscia; after the same
The Virgin and Infant, to whom St. Bernard is offering a Book; after Francesco Vanni
The Crucifixion, with the Virgin, St. Francis, and St. Theresa; after the same
Venus bound to a Tree, and Minerva chastising Cupid; after Agostino Carracci
Procne showing the Head of her son Itys to her husband Tereus; after the same
Seneca in the Bath; after the same
The Virgin caressing the Infant Jesus; after Raphael
The Entombment of Christ; after the same
The Virgin Mary, under an arch, ornamented with flowers by Angels; after Rubens
Judith cutting off the Head of Holofernes; after the same
The Four Fathers of the Church; after the same
A naked Woman grinding colours; after the same
Autumn and Winter; two landscapes; after the same
A Banquet, with Musicians; without the name of the painter

References

External links
 

1576 births
1650 deaths
Flemish engravers
Painters from Antwerp